Joel Roth is a prominent American rabbi in the Rabbinical Assembly, which is the rabbinical body of Conservative Judaism. He is a former member and chair of the assembly's Committee on Jewish Law and Standards (CJLS) which deals with questions of Jewish law and tradition, and serves as the Louis Finkelstein Professor of Talmud and Jewish Law at the Jewish Theological Seminary of America (JTSA or JTS) in New York City, where he formerly served as dean of the Rabbinical School.  He is also Rosh Yeshiva (head of school) of the Conservative Yeshiva in Jerusalem, Israel, an institution founded and maintained by the United Synagogue for Conservative Judaism and under the academic auspices of JTS. In 2006, Rabbi Roth took over as chair of the Hebrew Language department at JTS. Rabbi Roth is a well-known teacher of Hebrew grammar. He is a vociferous proponent of the existence of the "sheva merakhef" (the hovering schwa).

Background
Roth received a BA from Wayne State University in his hometown of Detroit. He also participated in the Herbert H. Lehman Institute of Talmudic Ethics, a special studies program. He received his master's degree at JTS, where he was ordained in 1968. That same year, Roth was appointed to the faculty of JTS as he continued his studies toward a PhD in Talmud, which he received in 1973. In the early 1970s Dr. Roth taught at the Prozdor of the Highland Park (N.J.) Conservative Temple and Center. Upon receiving his Ph.D., he was made an associate professor at JTS.

In addition to his teaching post at JTS, Roth has held four key administrative positions, serving as Dean of Students of List College (then called Seminary College), Director of the Melton Research Center for Jewish Education, and both Associate Dean and Dean of The Rabbinical School.

Terms as dean and resignations
Roth served as Dean of the Rabbinical School from 1981 to 1984 as well as in 1992–1993, resigning both times after a major scandal.  Roth resigned in 1984 as part of a settlement of a potential lawsuit by the family of a student whom Roth had allegedly sexually harassed.  The accusation was kept secret at the time, though it came to light when an anonymous letter surfaced in 1993 during Roth's second term as Dean.  Then, on March 29, 1993, Roth resigned after he allegedly made a sexually explicit statement to a student at the seminary's West Coast affiliate, the Los Angeles-based University of Judaism (now the American Jewish University), during a group interview. “He said inappropriate things to the student,” said Rabbi Elliot Dorff, the university provost and a member of the interview committee. JTA"

Role as halakhic decisor and controversies over homosexuality
An expert in Conservative approaches to, and interpretations of, the halakhah, Roth was appointed to the Committee on Jewish Law and Standards in 1978, and served as Chairman for eight years.  Many of his responsa for the CJLS have been published in a number of collections by the Rabbinical Assembly and the United Synagogue of Conservative Judaism.  In addition to articles and responsa for the Committee, Roth has written The Halakhic Process: A Systemic Analysis and Sefer ha-Mordecai: Tractate Kiddushin.

He is most well known for writing an influential responsum supporting the ordination of women as rabbis, which was considered by the JTS faculty as part of its 1983 women's ordination decision.  Roth is also author of a responsum arguing that homosexuality is forbidden specifically to Jews, supporting reaffirmation of the Conservative movement's then current stance  excluding open homosexuals from JTS rabbinic and cantorial schools, but arguing against a view that homosexuality is generally immoral or a social wrong.

On December 6, 2006, Roth resigned from the Committee on Jewish Law and Standards after the acceptance of a paper by Rabbis Elliot Dorff, Daniel Nevins and Avram Reisner on homosexual relationships and ordination of homosexual rabbis, while it upheld the biblical prohibition on male intercourse. The committee also adopted Roth's own, diametrically opposed responsum, maintaining a complete prohibition on homosexual conduct.

References

External links
 Joel Roth, On the Ordination of Women as Rabbis
 Joel Roth, We Can't Legitimate Homosexuality Halakhically
 Joel Roth, Homosexuality (1992)
 Rabbi Roth's Bio at www.jtsa.edu

Year of birth missing (living people)
Living people
American Conservative rabbis
Jewish Theological Seminary of America semikhah recipients
Clergy from Detroit
Wayne State University alumni
Conservative rosh yeshivas